Brigitte McMahon-Huber (born 25 March 1967 in Baar) is an athlete from Switzerland, who competed in triathlon.

McMahon competed at the first Olympic triathlon at the 2000 Summer Olympics.  She won the gold medal with a total time of 2:00:40.52, which until 2008 was the fastest time for a female in an Olympic triathlon.  Her split times were 19:44.58 for the swim, 1:05:42.30 for the cycling and 0:35:13.64 for the run.

McMahon-Huber competed at the second Olympic triathlon at the 2004 Summer Olympics, finishing tenth with a total time of 2:07:07.73.

McMahon tested positive for erythropoietin (EPO) during an out of competition control in June 2005. She maintains that she did not take any doping until well after the 2004 Athens Olympics where she came 10th and that she did it for therapeutic reasons only.  After the positive test she was immediately removed from the Swiss national team and was facing a two-year ban from triathlon. As a consequence she retired from the sport.

See also
List of sportspeople sanctioned for doping offences

References
 CNN report on doping
 Profile

External links
 

1967 births
Living people
People from Baar, Switzerland
Sportspeople from the canton of Zug
Swiss people of Irish descent
Swiss female triathletes
Olympic triathletes of Switzerland
Olympic gold medalists for Switzerland
Triathletes at the 2000 Summer Olympics
Triathletes at the 2004 Summer Olympics
Swiss sportspeople in doping cases
Doping cases in triathlon
Olympic medalists in triathlon
Medalists at the 2000 Summer Olympics